A Matter of Justice is a 1993 American television film directed by Michael Switzer and starring Patty Duke and Martin Sheen. Televised in two parts, it is based on a true story.

Premise
A true story about the mother of a murder victim seeking to bring her son's widow to justice and gain custody of her granddaughter.

Cast
 Patty Duke as Mary Brown
 Martin Sheen as Jack Brown
 Alexandra Powers as Kathy Charlene "Dusty" Brown
 Jason London as Lance Corporal Chris Randall Brown
 Jeff Kober as Talbot
 Cole Hauser as Private Ralph G. "Rocky" Jackson
 Danny Nucci as Private Vince Grella
 T. Max Graham as Harry Amblin
 Charles S. Dutton as Mr. McDaniel, Private Investigator
 Christopher John Fields as Warren Matthews

Production
Filming occurred in Kansas.

References

External links
 

1993 films
1993 television films
Films shot in Kansas
NBC network original films
Films directed by Michael Switzer
Films scored by David Michael Frank
1990s English-language films